is a Japanese swimmer. She competed in the women's 4 × 200 metre freestyle relay event at the 2016 Summer Olympics.

References

External links
 

1999 births
Living people
Japanese female butterfly swimmers
Japanese female freestyle swimmers
Olympic swimmers of Japan
Swimmers at the 2016 Summer Olympics
Place of birth missing (living people)
Asian Games medalists in swimming
Asian Games silver medalists for Japan
Swimmers at the 2018 Asian Games
Medalists at the 2018 Asian Games
Universiade medalists in swimming
Universiade silver medalists for Japan
Medalists at the 2019 Summer Universiade
21st-century Japanese women